Notarcha quaternalis is a species of moth of the family Crambidae. 
It can be found throughout Sub-Saharan Africa including many islands of the Indian Ocean.

This moth is yellow/white with some black spots at the foreside of the forewings. Its wingspan is around 18mm. 
The larvae are dark green with a dark brown/black head.
Hostplants of this species are Malvaceae (Sida sp., Sida carpinifolia)

References

External links
 Boldsystems.org: pictures of Notarcha quaternalis
 Africanmoths.com: pictures of Notarcha quaternalis

Spilomelinae
Moths described in 1852
Moths of Madagascar
Moths of Japan
Moths of the Comoros
Moths of Mauritius
Moths of Seychelles
Moths of Réunion
Moths of Sub-Saharan Africa